Serhiy Litovchenko (born 30 January 1979) is a Ukrainian former professional football player and current manager of Olimpik Donetsk. Some depict his last name as Lytovchenko.

References

External links
 
 

1979 births
Living people
Sportspeople from Mykolaiv
Ukrainian footballers
Association football defenders
Ukrainian expatriate footballers
Expatriate footballers in Latvia
Expatriate footballers in Belarus
Ukrainian expatriate sportspeople in Latvia
Ukrainian expatriate sportspeople in Belarus
FC Torpedo Minsk players
FC Dnipro Cherkasy players
SC Tavriya Simferopol players
FC Arsenal Kyiv players
FC Volyn Lutsk players
FC Helios Kharkiv players
MFC Mykolaiv players
Ukrainian Premier League players
Ukrainian First League players
Ukrainian Second League players
Ukrainian football managers
Ukrainian expatriate football managers
Expatriate football managers in Belarus
FC Arsenal Kyiv managers
FC Dnepr Mogilev managers
FC Olimpik Donetsk managers